Alex Henrique da Silva, better known as Alex (pronounced: [aˈlɛks]; born 6 January 1982), is a retired Brazilian-born Armenian football player, known for playing at the Yerevan-based FC Mika of the Armenian Premier League. He also played for the Armenia national football team.

International career
Alex made his debut with the Armenia national football team in a friendly against the United Arab Emirates national football team on 27 May 2014 in Switzerland.

Statistics

Club

International

Statistics accurate as of match played 31 May 2014

Honours
 Mika
Armenian Cup
Winner (2): 2006, 2011

References

1982 births
Living people
Association football defenders
Brazilian emigrants to Armenia
Brazilian footballers
Armenian footballers
Armenia international footballers
FC Mika players
Armenian Premier League players
Naturalized citizens of Armenia
Armenian people of Brazilian descent
FC Volga Ulyanovsk players
People from Ribeirão Preto
Footballers from São Paulo (state)